Luk Keng may refer to:

Luk Keng, an area in the North District of Hong Kong, containing several villages, including:
Luk Keng Chan Uk
Luk Keng Lam Uk
Luk Keng Wong Uk
Luk Keng Village: A village in Yam O, Lantau Island, Hong Kong